Augustus Burke Shepherd  (1839–1885) was a Fellow of the Royal College of Physicians who later became the dean of St. Mary's Hospital, Paddington. Shepherd graduated from Brasenose College, Oxford with a B. Med. in 1865. He then became a doctor at St. Mary's, and was notable for delivering the Goulstonian Lectures in 1876. His parents lived in St. Leonard's on Sea. He married Amelia Staines (later Amelia Jackson). Shepherd had a tendency to drink too much and died at the age of 46.

References

External links
 

1839 births
1885 deaths
19th-century English medical doctors
Alumni of Brasenose College, Oxford
Fellows of the Royal College of Physicians